Birds described in 1886 include: Arizona woodpecker; blue ground dove; Brazza's martin;common smoky honeyeater; dark hawk-cuckoo;double-banded greytail; blue-breasted blue flycatcher ; snoring rail; point-tailed palmcreeper; and little minivet.

Events
Death of Eugen von Boeck, 
Clinton Hart Merriam becomes the first chief of the Division of Economic Ornithology and Mammalogy of the United States Department of Agriculture.
George Arthur Keartland joins the Field Naturalists Club of Victoria.

Publications
Herman Schalow Die Musophagidae (1886)
Władysław Taczanowski, 1886. Ornithologie du Pérou. R. Friedländer & Sohn. Berlin. Vol 3: 522 pp. + 1 map  Tables: 218 pp. online BHL 
Robert Ridgway A Nomenclature of Colors for Naturalists
Hans von Berlepsch Kritische Bemerkungen zur Colibri-Literatur, Separat. aus der Festschrift des Vereins für Naturkunde zu Cassel, vol. 1, 1886  [ Literature from 1537 sic.

Ongoing events
Osbert Salvin and Frederick DuCane Godman 1879–1904. Biologia Centrali-Americana . Aves
Richard Bowdler Sharpe Catalogue of the Birds in the British Museum London,1874-98.
Anton Reichenow, Hans von Berlepsch,  and other members of the German Ornithologists' Society in Journal für Ornithologie online BHLOrnis; internationale Zeitschrift für die gesammte Ornithologie.Vienna 1885-1905 online BHLThe Auk online BHLThe Ibis''

References

Bird
Birding and ornithology by year